Ek Villain: There's One in Every Love Story is a 2014 Indian Hindi-language action thriller film directed by Mohit Suri and produced by Shobha Kapoor and Ekta Kapoor under Balaji Motion Pictures. Based on a script written by Tushar Hiranandani and Milap Milan Zaveri, it stars Riteish Deshmukh, Siddharth Malhotra and Shraddha Kapoor in lead roles. It tells the story of a young woman who is murdered by a serial killer and her husband's attempts to take revenge on the killer who killed his wife. 

Ek Villain was released worldwide on 27 June 2014 and received positive reviews from critics, garnering praise for its theme, direction, screenplay with Deshmukh receiving particular praise in his first ever negative role. Made on a budget of  crore, the film was a major box-office success with earnings of over  crore domestically and a worldwide gross of  crore. The songs "Galliyan", "Zaroorat", "Hamdard" became huge hits.

Malhotra and Deshmukh later reunited for the 2019 masala actioner Marjaavaan, in which Deshmukh's entry as the antagonist was accompanied by him singing the award winning song "Galliyan" from the Ek Villain soundtrack. A sequel titled Ek Villain Returns, starring John Abraham and Arjun Kapoor, along with Disha Patani and Tara Sutaria, was released in July 2022; Deshmukh reprises his role in the sequel both as part of archive footage and for a mid-credits appearance.

Plot 
A young woman Aisha Verma, tries to leave a message for her husband, Guru Divekar, when a masked man who has entered her house, kills her by defenestration. At her funeral, CBI officer Aditya Rathore points out that it is vital to track down the murderer or else Guru will go on a killing spree. 

Flashback: Guru was a ruthless hitman working for mob boss Caesar, who raised and trained him to murder the goons who killed his parents. When Guru is arrested for killing Debu, Debu's mother refuses to testify against him, and warns him that one day God will make him pay for his crimes, by making him lose his loved one. Guru soon falls in love with Aisha, an optimistic girl dying from a terminal illness, and they get married. Guru gives up his old life and gets a job while Aisha receives treatment in Mumbai and recovers. She discovers she is pregnant and decides to tell Guru in person when he returns from his interview, but is murdered before that. 

Present: Rakesh Mahadkar is an unsuccessful man who is constantly insulted and ridiculed by his wife Sulochana for his shortcomings. While he dearly loves his wife, he vents out his frustration by murdering other women who speak rudely to him, and Aisha turns out to be one of them.  

Guru hunts down Rakesh and brutally beats him up, then admits him to a hospital and pays for the expenses, intending to punish him by repeatedly bringing him to the brink of death, saving him, and doing it all over again. At the hospital, when Guru learns that Aisha was pregnant, he is devastated. While assaulting a nurse, Rakesh is again intercepted by Guru. Rakesh realizes that Guru is Aisha's husband and is seeking vengeance. Upon the suggestion of his friend Brijesh, he taunts Guru over the phone and then kills Aisha's father.  

Rakesh expects Guru to kill him so that he can die as a hero in the eyes of Sulochana and everyone else while Guru will be tarnished. However, Caesar calls Guru and says that he has killed Sulochana to avenge Aisha for Guru, and left Rakesh's little son Manish for Guru to kill. An enraged Rakesh stabs Guru with a screw driver and takes up a boulder to kill him, but is hit by a car and dies from his injuries. Guru adopts Rakesh’s son Manish and completes the wishes on Aisha's bucket list.

Cast 

 Sidharth Malhotra as Guru Divaker 
 Shraddha Kapoor as Aisha Verma 
 Riteish Deshmukh as Rakesh Mahadkar
 Kamaal Rashid Khan as Brijesh Yadav
 Aamna Sharif as Sulochana Mahadkar
 Remo Fernandes as Caesar (Sahiba)
 Shaad Randhawa as ACP Aditya Rathore
 Asif Basra as Aadesh Verma
 Rishina Kandhari as Jia Shinde
 Prachi Desai (special appearance in song "Awari")
 Vidyadhar Karmakar as Chotu from mental asylum
 Rumana Molla as Nidhi Sharma

Production

Development
Ekta Kapoor signed Mohit Suri to direct a romantic thriller. Ek Villain was earlier reported to be a remake of the Korean film I Saw the Devil, though Suri, the director, refuted the claim. Suri stated that every character in the film would have grey shades.

Marketing and promotions
The Central Board of Film Certification (CBFC) cleared the film with a U/A certificate after a total of eight cuts designed to tone down the action sequences and mute a particular word. Tanuj Garg, representative of Balaji Motion Pictures stated the cuts were less than a minute of screen time.

The movie's official teaser which was released on 4 April 2014 with the film Main Tera Hero, got 1 million views on YouTube within three days of release. The official trailer of 2 minutes 18 secs was launched later and was well received by critics, as well as garnered praise from around the industry, including Karan Johar, Ranbir Kapoor, Katrina Kaif among others.

Sidharth Malhotra, Shraddha Kapoor, Riteish Deshmukh, Mohit Suri and the film's music directors attended a musical event in Mumbai to promote the soundtrack of the film. Further, Malhotra and Kapoor promoted the movie at the IPL semi-finals as well as on reality shows like Jhalak Dikhhla Jaa. Promotion campaigns were also organized across the country in cities like Jaipur, Kolkata and Delhi. As a part of the promotional strategy, a television show based on Bollywood villains was hosted by Malhotra.

Soundtrack

The songs are composed by Mithoon, Ankit Tiwari and the band Soch. The lyrics are written by Manoj Muntashir, Mithoon and members of Soch. The album consists of six songs with Tiwari composing "Galliyan", Mithoon composing "Zaroorat", "Humdard," and "Banjaara" while the remaining track "Awari" is composed by Soch.

The film score was composed by Raju Singh.

Reception
Mohar Basu of Koimoi gave the album 4/5 stars and wrote, "Mohit Suri's taste for melody cannot be doubted as the filmmaker uses an album that is a fine blend of ballads and rock, infusing the right octave of harmony is every single song. In a long time, there hasn't come an album which has such perfectly pitched songs, each of them a winner. Music Directors get all the credit for creating a wholesome album like this." Rediff also awarded the album 4 out of 5 stars and noted, "The music of Ek Villain meets the high expectations that one had from it. Mohit Suri maintains his record of coming up with memorable music for each of his films." Filmfare wrote, "All-in-all, The OST of Ek Villain is another winner for Mohit Suri who has a knack for bringing out the best in his music directors. Go for it if you like soulful romantic tracks with loads of fusion thrown in."

Release
Ek Villain was released theatrically on 27 June 2014, in 2539 screens in the domestic market.

Critical reception
Ek Villain received positive reviews from critics with praise for the performances of Deshmukh in particular.

Taran Adarsh of Bollywood Hungama awarded the movie 4/5 stars and wrote that, "On the whole, Ek Villain is a stylish, spellbinding and terrifying edge-of-the-seat thriller. It's a step forward in this genre, without a doubt. A sure-shot winner!" Raedita Tandon from Filmfare gave the film 4/5 stars and stated that, "Though indulgent in parts, Ek Villain packs in a punch. Copy of a Korean film or not, it's 'good' paisa vasool entertainment. ." Meena Iyer of The Times of India gave the film 3 stars in a scale of 5, stating that "You cannot fault the scale of Ek Villain or berate its lead star cast. But you wish you could celebrate this thriller like you did Suri's last movie outing Aashiqui 2. This one lacks soul."

Aparna Mudi of Zee News gave the film a rating of 2.5/5 stars, concluding her review that "The unveiling of the visceral saga has a lot of strong characters and Mohit has done a good job in adapting a foreign film and complementing it with the drama that the Indian audience is used to. But he has gone a tad over in making a thriller. Maybe, filmmakers should step out of this trap more often and we wouldn`t be too far from making beacons of world cinema." Rajeev Masand of CNN-IBN stated that "I'm going with two-and-a-half out of five for 'Ek Villain'. If you're still wondering, the real villain here is the lousy script".

Shubhra Gupta of The Indian Express gave the film 2 stars, commenting that "Suri is an innate storyteller, and can keep things moving. All he needs is a strong, all-the-way credible, original plot." Saibal Chatterjee of NDTV rated the film 2/5 and wrote that "As a whole, this film, besides its surface flair, does not have too much to fall back upon. Watch it only if that is good enough for you." Raja Sen of Rediff gave the film 1.5 stars out of 5, stating that "Given free tickets, sure, you could escape Humshakals in theatres this weekend with this mediocre effort, but I say do yourself a favour and seek out the Korean DVD. (Uncover it, even.) Now that's bloody special."

Box office
Ek Villain had what Box Office India called "very good" opening, with occupancies at around 55–60%.

Ek Villain collected  outside India in its first weekend.

Sequel 

A standalone sequel, Ek Villain 2, which was later renamed as Ek Villain Returns, was officially announced on 30 January 2020. The film shows a face-off between two villains played by Arjun Kapoor & John Abraham while Disha Patani & Tara Sutaria play female leads, and was released on 29 July 2022. The song "Galliyan" was recreated for the film titled "Galliyan Returns" sung and composed by Tiwari and written by Muntashir.

Shaad Randhawa and Riteish Deshmukh reprise their roles as ACP Aditya Rathore and Rakesh Mahadkar from the first film, respectively; with Deshmukh appearing in archived footage and later physically as a cameo in the mid-credits scene, revealing that he survived his fate from the first film.

In popular culture
 Ritesh Deshmukh appeared as a cameo in the 2016 film Kyaa Kool Hain Hum 3  where he disguised as Rakesh reciting his punch dialogue "Shikayat Ka Mauka Nahi Dunga". The film also mentioned the song "Galliyan". The film is also produced by Ekta Kapoor and Shobha Kapoor.
 Ritesh appeared as a cameo in the 2016 film Mastizaade in the title track reprising his role Rakesh. The film was directed by Milap Zaveri who wrote dialogue for Ek Villain.
 Ritesh was seen humming the song "Galliyan" in the 2019 film Marjaavaan also directed by Milap Zaveri. The film also features Siddharth Malhotra in lead role and Ritesh played the role of main antagonist. This marked their second collaboration after Ek Villain.

Awards and nominations

Notes

References

External links

 

2014 films
2010s Hindi-language films
2014 action thriller films
Films scored by Ankit Tiwari
Films scored by Mithoon
Indian films about revenge
Indian remakes of South Korean films
Indian action thriller films
Indian nonlinear narrative films
Fictional portrayals of the Maharashtra Police
Balaji Motion Pictures films
Indian serial killer films
Indian pregnancy films
Films directed by Mohit Suri
2010s serial killer films
Films shot in the Maldives